Alness United Football Club are a Scottish football club based in Alness, Highland. They currently compete in the North Caledonian Football League and play in black and white striped shirts with black shorts. The club has won the North Caledonian League on four occasions.

Alness play their home games at Dalmore Park, previously on a grass pitch but in 2022 they moved to a new artificial turf pitch with floodlights adjacent to Alness Academy.

They were given the Scottish Football Association's prestigious Quality Mark Development Award in July 2011.

United took a year out in 2019–20 but returned to the North Caledonian League the following season, winning the one-off Division Two as the league split for the 2020–21 season to reduce fixtures due to the Covid-19 pandemic.

Honours
North Caledonian League
Champions: 1972–73, 1973–74, 2000–01, 2004–05

North Caledonian League Division Two
Champions: 2020–21

North Caledonian Cup 
Winners: 1973–74, 1999–00, 2013–14

Football Times Cup 
Winners: 2000–01, 2018–19

Chic Allan Cup
Winners: 1980–81, 2002–03, 2003–04

MacNicol Trophy 
Winners: 1980–81

Ness Cup 
Winners: 1977–78, 2020–21

Morris Newton / SWL Cup 
Winners: 1979–80, 1999–00, 2004–05

References

External links
 
 

Football clubs in Scotland
Alness
North Caledonian Football League teams
Football in Highland (council area)